Events from the year 1598 in India.

Events
The first known English use of zero was in 1598.

Births
 12 January – Jijabai, mother of Shivaji, (died 1674)

Deaths
 Mata Bhani, also known as Bibi Bhani, daughter of third Sikh guru Guru Amar Das, wife of fourth Sikh guru Guru Ram Das, and mother of fifth Sikh guru Guru Arjan Dev dies (born 1535)

See also
 Timeline of Indian history

References